is a series of 2.5D stage musicals co-produced by Nelke Planning, DMM.com, and Euclid Agency based on the online browser game Touken Ranbu. The musicals were directed by Isamu Kayano, with screenplay by Chūji Mikasano and choreography by Tetsuhara. The musicals were first announced in 2015 at the same time Stage: Touken Ranbu, a "straight play" adaptation, was announced.

Along with the musical, music from the cast members was released under the name  and consecutively topped music charts. Furthermore, Touken Danshi has made several television appearances performing as their respective characters.

Production history

The musical had a trial run from October 30, 2015 to November 8, 2015. The success of the trial run led to the musical's first official show, which ran from May to June 2016. To promote the show, Musical: Touken Ranbu began releasing music performed by the cast members under the collective name . The opening number for the play, "Touken Ranbu" (刀剣乱舞), was released as a single on January 1, 2016, performed by the cast members under the name . The ending theme, "Kimi no Uta", was released as a single on July 6, 2016. The cast also performed the songs live on the television show Music Japan.

The second musical, ran from September 24, 2016 to November 27, 2016. The musical's ending theme, "Yume Hitotsu", was released as a single on March 29, 2017 and was performed by the cast under the name . Songs from the single took the top 8 on Dwango's Weekly Charts upon release. While on a slight break in between the production of Bakumatsu Tenroden, the cast was invited to perform a one-night only showing commemorating the 20th Anniversary of Itsukushima Shrine's UNESCO World Heritage Site Registration called Musical Touken Ranbu in Itsukushima Jinja.

The third musical, ran from March 4, 2017 to April 23, 2017, and it was also live-streamed in theaters across Hong Kong, Taiwan, Thailand, and Indonesia. The musical also ran in Zhuhai, China, from May 19, 2017 to May 21, 2017. The musical's theme song, "Shōri no Gaika", was released as a single on September 27, 2017 under the name . The single sold more than 90,000 copies and debuted at #1 on the Oricon Weekly Singles Chart.

The fourth musical, was announced at the final show of Mihotose no Komoriuta. The shows ran from November 4, 2017 to January 30, 2018. The musical's theme song, "Be in Sight", was released as a single on March 16, 2017 and was performed by the cast under the name . The single was bundled with a music video and was released six different versions for both preorder and press editions, one for each of the six featured characters, along with a solo song from either of the six characters depending on the version.

Ryuji Sato, who played Kashuu Kiyomitsu, released his first solo single as the character on December 25, 2017, and held a series of concerts from September 12, 2018 to October 13, 2018. Starting from April 8, 2018, the cast of the musicals had their own radio show, with Hisanori Yoshida as the MC. The radio show was broadcast on Monday evenings on Nippon Broadcasting System.

The fifth musical, ran from March 2018 to May 2018.

A re-run of Atsukashiyama Ibun took place at Japonisme 2018 in Paris, France, before returning to Tokyo in August 2018. Ryo Kitazono, who played Kogitsunemaru, was unable to perform on stage in Paris due to surgery for a retinal detachment and played the character in voice only. The stage part of the performance was played by Daisuke Iwasaki, an ensemble member, for their performances upon returning to Japan. During the live concert part of the Japan performances, the spot for Kogitsunemaru was left empty.

In October 2018, the cast of Musical: Touken Ranbu were invited to perform on NHK's Songs of Tokyo, where they performed under the name Touken Danshi Formation of Tokyo. The cast was also invited to perform at the 69th NHK Kōhaku Uta Gassen.

On January 20, 2019 through March 24, 2019, a re-run of the 3rd musical, Mihotose no Komoriuta, occurred, visiting 3 cities for a total of 73 performances. Kashuu Kiyomitsu's solo Tanki Shitsujin which is on its third year will be having its first Asia Tour will start in April 2019 to May 7, 2019 and will visit Shanghai, Bangkok, Macau, and Japan.

From July 4 through 14th, 2019,  ran for 17 performances at the Shinagawa Prince Hotel Stellar Ball in Tokyo. The musical featured the characters of Higekiri (Hiroki Miura) and Hizamaru (Akira Takano) interpreting the story of Soga in a kabuki-style manner. A re-run of the same play is scheduled to run through from August to October in 2020.

The franchise released its sixth full-scale musical, Kishou Hongi (葵咲本紀), which ran from August 3 through October 27, 2019, touring in 4 cities across Japan for a total of 74 performances.

The franchise will release its seventh full-scale musical, Shizuka no Umi no Paraiso (〜静かの海のパライソ〜), which is slated to run from March 21 through May 31, 2020, touring in 4 cities across Japan for a total of 64 performances.

In addition, the franchise has regularly run a year-end series of live performances since 2016, entitled Shinken Ranbu Sai.

The franchise announced on January 16, 2020 that it has accumulated a total of 1 million audience members after 4 and a half year from the started of the production

Principal cast and characters

Main cast

Critical reception
Justine Mouron from Journal du Japon described the stage design as limited, yet immersive, with praise towards the costume design and energy of the actors. However, due to the lack of change in choreography to make up for Ryo Kitazono's physical absence (who was unable to appear on stage due to a retinal detachment), she pointed out there was a "vacuum" at times.

Discography

Soundtrack albums

Singles

DVD releases

References

External links
 Official website

Musicals based on video games
Japanese musicals
2015 musicals
2016 musicals
2017 musicals
2018 plays
2.5D musicals
Works based on Internet-based works